Pelagomyia is a genus of flies in the family Stratiomyidae.

Species
Pelagomyia albitalis Williston, 1896 - St. Vincent.
Pelagomyia illucens James, 1967 - Dominica

References

Stratiomyidae
Brachycera genera
Taxa named by Samuel Wendell Williston
Diptera of North America